In optics, smear is used to refer to motion that has low temporal frequency relative to the integration/exposure time.  This typically results from a relative rate of the image with respect to the detector (e.g., caused by movement in the scene).  Smear is typically differentiated from jitter, which has a higher frequency relative to the integration time.  Whereas smear refers to a relatively constant rate during the integration/exposure time, jitter refers to a relatively sinusoidal motion during the integration/exposure time.

The equation for the optical modulation transfer function associated with smear is the standard sinc function associated with an extended sample

References

Imaging
Science of photography